Saeristavo, in historical and scientific literature with this term is defined a territorial unit in old Georgia, which was ruled by Eristavi (duke).

List of the Duchies of Kingdom of Georgia

See also
Eristavi

References 
 GSE, (1984) volume 8, page 633, Tbilisi.

Geographic history of Georgia (country)
Nobility of Georgia (country)
Noble titles of Georgia (country)
Titles
Georgian words and phrases